Ošupe Parish is an administrative unit of Madona Municipality, Latvia.

Towns, villages and settlements of Ošupe parish 

Parishes of Latvia
Madona Municipality